A104, A.104 or A-104 may refer to:
 AS-104, a 1965 spaceflight in the Apollo program
 Aero A.104, a 1937 Czechoslovakian biplane light bomber and reconnaissance aircraft
 Agusta A.104, a 1960 Italian prototype light helicopter 
 RFA Eaglesdale (A104), a 1941 Royal Fleet Auxiliary fleet tanker ship

Roads 

 A104 roads, a disambiguation page